Sri Rakum School for the Blind is a school for the visually impaired in the city of Bangalore, India. It offers free education to blind students from kindergarten to post-graduation. The training imparted includes reading and writing through Braille and mobility training for totally blind children. Pre-school aged students with blindness are trained early on to prepare them for their eventual completion of school, college and vocational education.

Founder

The school was founded by Acharya Sri Rakum in June 1998. He left behind a career in martial arts in Japan and India, to develop the school. He is currently the principal of this school.

References

External links
 http://www.rakum.org/
 http://timesofindia.indiatimes.com/bangalore-times/a-school-that-teaches-them-lessons-on-life/articleshow/680222631.cms
 
 
 
 
 
 https://www.thebetterindia.com/34724/acharya-sri-rakum-school-for-the-blind/

Private schools in Bangalore
Educational institutions established in 1998
Schools for the blind in India
1998 establishments in Karnataka